Bruno Miguel Brás Rodrigues (born 3 October 1996) is a Portuguese professional footballer.

Career statistics

Club

Notes

References

1996 births
Living people
Portuguese footballers
Association football forwards
Campeonato de Portugal (league) players
Kakkonen players
Veikkausliiga players
U.D. Leiria players
A.C. Alcanenense players
S.L. Benfica B players
Real S.C. players
C.D. Aves players
Salon Palloilijat players
SC Kuopio Futis-98 players
Kuopion Palloseura players
Portuguese expatriate footballers
Portuguese expatriate sportspeople in Finland
People from Tomar
Sportspeople from Santarém District